Wonderland is the fifth full-length studio album by English Gothic rock band Nosferatu. It was released in the UK in March 2011 by Dark Fortune Records. It was available on export to Germany, Austria and Switzerland with distribution by Indigo, to USA with distribution by Revelation Records and Italy with distribution by Audioglobe.  It is their first album to see the return of vocalist Louis DeWray who rejoined the band in 2003. The album was recorded and mixed at Louis DeWray's Earth Terminal Studios between 2004 and 2011.

Track listing

Credits and personnel

Louis DeWray – Vocals, guitar & keyboards
Damien DeVille – Lead Guitar
Nevyn MoonShadow – Bass Guitar
Belle Star – Drums
Eddie McEvil – Drums on "Somebody Put Something in My Drink", "Bombers" and "Black Hole"
Stefan Diablo – Bass guitar on "Somebody Put Something In My Drink"

References 

2011 albums
Nosferatu (band) albums